The Musulman Mosque is a mosque in Ho Chi Minh City, Vietnam.

History
The mosque was established in 1935 as the India Jamia Muslim Mosque.

Architecture
The mosque was constructed with ancient Roman architectural style. It consists of four minarets.

See also
 Islam in Vietnam
 List of mosques in Vietnam

References

1935 establishments in Spain
Mosques completed in 1935
Mosques in Vietnam
Religious buildings and structures in Ho Chi Minh City